The Kasegaluk Lagoon (Iñupiaq: Qasigialik) is a coastal lagoon located in the western part of the North Slope of Alaska.  It is separated from the Chukchi Sea by a series of long, thin barrier islands that stretch south and north-east from the town of Point Lay and westwards down to Icy Cape.  There are seven passes through these islands.  The lagoon receives the waters from the Kukpowruk, Kokolik, and Utukok Rivers.

The lagoon's Inuit name was formerly reported as "Kasegarlik" but it was changed in 1929 to its present spelling. In 1965, at Wainwright, the lagoon's name was recorded as "Kasegelik," meaning "spotted seal place" or "having spotted seal."

See also
 List of islands of Alaska

References

External links 
Google Maps: Map, Satellite Image
Diagramatic map available on Page 40 of Lowry, L.F., K.J. Frost, R. Davis, R.S. Suydam, and D.P. DeMaster. 1994.

U.S. Dept. of Commerce NOAA Tech. Memo. NMFS-AFSC-38, 71 pages.

Lagoons of Alaska
Bodies of water of North Slope Borough, Alaska